RI-1 may refer to:

 Rhode Island's 1st congressional district
 RI-1 (chemical), an experimental oncology drug
 U.S. Route 1 in Rhode Island, a portion of a north–south highway in the United States